Summitview is a census-designated place (CDP) in Yakima County, Washington, United States. The population was 967 at the 2010 census.

Based on per capita income, Summitview ranks 18th of 522 areas in the state of Washington to be ranked. It is also the highest rank achieved in Yakima County.

Geography
Summitview is located at  (46.598447, -120.638403).

According to the United States Census Bureau, the CDP has a total area of 2.6 square miles (6.7 km2), all of it land.

Demographics
As of the census of 2000, there were 900 people, 294 households, and 256 families residing in the CDP. The population density was 348.6 people per square mile (134.7/km2). There were 308 housing units at an average density of 119.3/sq mi (46.1/km2). The racial makeup of the CDP was 94.33% White, 0.33% Native American, 0.22% Pacific Islander, 3.33% from other races, and 1.78% from two or more races. Hispanic or Latino of any race were 7.78% of the population.

There were 294 households, out of which 45.9% had children under the age of 18 living with them, 79.3% were married couples living together, 5.4% had a female householder with no husband present, and 12.9% were non-families. 9.9% of all households were made up of individuals, and 2.7% had someone living alone who was 65 years of age or older. The average household size was 3.06 and the average family size was 3.29.

In the CDP, the age distribution of the population shows 29.8% under the age of 18, 6.4% from 18 to 24, 27.0% from 25 to 44, 26.6% from 45 to 64, and 10.2% who were 65 years of age or older. The median age was 40 years. For every 100 females, there were 100.4 males. For every 100 females age 18 and over, there were 103.9 males.

The median income for a household in the CDP was $66,944, and the median income for a family was $67,083. Males had a median income of $48,036 versus $25,139 for females. The per capita income for the CDP was $36,301. About 2.8% of families and 2.6% of the population were below the poverty line, including none of those under age 18 and 11.5% of those age 65 or over.

References

Census-designated places in Yakima County, Washington
Census-designated places in Washington (state)